Jean-Denis Garon is a Canadian politician who was elected to represent the riding of Mirabel in the House of Commons of Canada in the 2021 Canadian federal election.

An economist, Garon is a professor at UQAM's School of Management Sciences.

References

External links

Living people
Bloc Québécois MPs
Members of the House of Commons of Canada from Quebec
21st-century Canadian politicians
1980s births
Canadian economists
Academic staff of the Université du Québec à Montréal